Belarusian may refer to:
 Something of, or related to Belarus
 Belarusians, people from Belarus, or of Belarusian descent
 A citizen of Belarus, see Demographics of Belarus
 Belarusian language
 Belarusian culture
 Belarusian cuisine
 Byelorussian Soviet Socialist Republic

See also 
 
 Belorussky (disambiguation)

Language and nationality disambiguation pages